Jan Fryderyk Sapieha (1680–1751) was a Polish-Lithuanian nobleman, Grand Recorder of Lithuania between 1706 and 1709, since 1716 – the castellan of Trakai and after 1735 – the Grand Chancellor of Lithuania.

Secular senators of the Polish–Lithuanian Commonwealth
1680 births
1751 deaths
Jan Fryderyk Sapieha
Grand Chancellors of the Grand Duchy of Lithuania